Nakhon Pathom ((Pronunciation)) is one of the central provinces (changwat) of Thailand. Neighbouring provinces are (from north clockwise) Suphan Buri, Ayutthaya, Nonthaburi, Bangkok, Samut Sakhon, Ratchaburi, and Kanchanaburi. The capital city of Nakhon Pathom province is Nakhon Pathom.

Nakhon Pathom province is home to the Phra Pathommachedi, a chedi commissioned by King Mongkut (Rama IV) and completed by King Chulalongkorn (Rama V) in 1870. The chedi is a reminder of the long vanished Dvaravati civilization that once flourished here and by tradition Nakhon Pathom is where Buddhism first came to Thailand. The province itself is known for its many fruit orchards.

Geography
Nakhon Pathom is a small province 56 km from Bangkok. It is in the alluvial plain of central Thailand and is drained by the Tha Chin River (sometimes called the Nakhon Chai Si), a tributary of the Chao Phraya River. There are many canals that have been dug for agriculture. The total forest area is just  or 0.8 per mille of provincial area. The capital city of Bangkok has grown until it borders Nakhon Pathom.

Climate
Nakhon Pathom province has a tropical savanna climate (Köppen climate classification category Aw). Winters are dry and warm. Temperatures rise until May. Monsoon season runs from May through October, with heavy rain and somewhat cooler temperatures during the day, although nights remain warm. Climatological data for the years 2012–2013: Its maximum temperature is 40.1 °C (104.2 °F) in April 2013 and the lowest temperature is 12.0 °C (53.6 °F) in December 2013. The highest average temperature is 37.4 °C (99.3 °F) in April 2013 and the minimum average temperature is 16.5 °C (61.7 °F) in December 2013. The average relative humidity is 75% and the minimum relative humidity is 22%. Annual rainfall is 1,095 millimeters. The number of rainy days was 134 days for the year 2013.

Toponymy
The name derives from the Pali words Nagara Pathama, meaning 'first city', and Nakhon Pathom is often referred as Thailand's oldest city. Archaeological remains have been linked to the (pre-Thai) Dvaravati kingdom, dating to the 6th through 11th centuries.

History
Nakhon Pathom Province centuries ago was a coastal city on the route between China and India; due to sedimentation from the Chao Phraya River, the coastline moved much farther to sea. When the Tha Chin River changed its course, the city lost its main water source and thus was for hundreds of years deserted, the population moving to a city called Nakhon Chai Si (or Sri Wichai). King Mongkut (Rama IV) ordered the restoration of the Phra Pathom Chedi, which was then crumbling and abandoned in the jungle. A city gradually formed around it, bringing new life to Nakhon Pathom. A museum presents the archaeological record of the city's history.

Major settlement of the province included immigration beginning in the reign of King Buddha Loetla Nabhalai (Rama II), which included Khmer villages (e.g., Don Yai Hom), the Lan Na-populated (Baan Nua) and Lao Song villages (e.g., Don Kanak), as well as a major influx of southern Chinese in the late-1800s and early-1900s. Today Nakhon Pathom attracts people from all over Thailand, most notably from Bangkok and Isan, plus Burmese migrant workers. The province includes industrial zones, major university towns, government offices relocated from Bangkok, and agricultural and transport hubs.

Economy
In mid-2019, the Department of Airports (DOA) proposed the construction of a new airport in the province, to relieve pressure on Bangkok's two existing airports. The 20 billion baht airport would occupy 3,500 rai of land in Bang Len District and Nakhon Chai Si District. Its capacity would be 25 million passengers annually. If approved, construction would start in 2023 and the airport would be operational by 2025 or 2026. When fully built-out, the airport will accommodate 80-100 seat aircraft flying between Bangkok and second-tier provinces to ease congestion at Suvarnabhumi and Don Mueang airports. The project site has low population density, only 200 households on 400 plots of land.

Health 
Nakhon Pathom's main hospital is Nakhon Pathom Hospital, operated by the Ministry of Public Health.

Symbols
The provincial seal shows Phra Pathom Chedi, at 127 meters the tallest pagoda in the world. It is in the center of the city of Nakhon Pathom, and has been an important Buddhist center since the 6th century. The current building was created by King Mongkut in 1860. On the pagoda a royal crown is depicted, the symbol for King Mongkut's work on reconstructing the pagoda.

The provincial flag is blue with the yellow provincial seal in the middle of the flag.

The provincial tree Diospyros decandra (known as "chan" in Thai). The provincial slogan is "sweet pomelos, delicious rice, beautiful young ladies".

Administrative divisions

Provincial government

The province is divided into seven districts (amphoes). The districts are further subdivided into 106 subdistricts (tambons) and 904 villages (mubans).

Local government
As of 10 October 2020 there are: one Nakhon Pathom Provincial Administrative Organization - PAO and twenty-six municipal (thesaban) areas in the province. The capital Nakhon Pathom has city (thesaban nakhon) status. Further five have town (thesaban mueang) status and twenty subdistrict municipalities (thesaban tambon). 

The non-municipal areas are administered by 91 Subdistrict Administrative
Organizations (SAO) (ongkan borihan suan tambon).

Human achievement index 2017

Since 2003, United Nations Development Programme (UNDP) in Thailand has tracked progress on human development at sub-national level using the Human achievement index (HAI), a composite index covering all the eight key areas of human development. National Economic and Social Development Board (NESDB) has taken over this task since 2017.

References

External links
 
 Province page from the Tourist Authority of Thailand

 Website of province (Thai only)
 Nakhon Pathom provincial map, coat of arms and postal stamp
 Jesada Technik Museum(Thai only)

 
Provinces of Thailand